The Canterbury Rams are a New Zealand basketball team based in Christchurch. The Rams compete in the National Basketball League (NBL) and play their home games at Cowles Stadium. For sponsorship reasons, they are known as The Wheeler Motor Canterbury Rams.

Team history
The Canterbury Rams were a foundation member of the National Basketball League (NBL) in 1982. Between 1986 and 1994, the Rams made the NBL final seven times, winning championships in 1986, 1989, 1990 and 1992. Import players Kenny Perkins, Clyde Huntley, Eddie Anderson and Angelo Hill were central to the success of the Rams, as was the outstanding New Zealand core of John "Dutchie" Rademakers, Gilbert Gordon, Andy Bennett, Graham Timms, John Hill, Ian Webb, Glen Denham and Ralph Lattimore. The architects of this success were coaches Garry Pettis, who led the team from 1986 to 1988, and Keith Mair, who took over in 1989. In 1999, the Rams made their eighth NBL final under coach Bert Knops, where they lost 79–72 to the Auckland Rebels.

In 2000, Dr John Watson took over the Rams organisation from the cash-strapped Canterbury Basketball Association (CBA). His takeover of the team created some deep divisions within the basketball community. In 2006, the CBA signed a three-year management contract with Watson. In December 2008, after the CBA advised Watson that they would not be completing the third year of the contract, the Rams withdrew from the NBL, with the Christchurch Cougars taking their place in the 2009 NBL season. The Cougars lasted just two seasons after withdrawing on the eve of the 2011 season due to the Christchurch earthquake.

In November 2013, the Canterbury Rams were granted re-entry into NBL under the leadership of Christchurch businessman Andrew Harrison, making their return during the 2014 NBL season.

In 2016, the Rams were regular season winners for the first time since 1993 behind the likes of McKenzie Moore and Marcel Jones. They made their first playoff appearance since 2002, and as the first seed, they were aiming for their first NBL final since 1999. However, they went on to lose 104–85 to the Super City Rangers in the semi-finals despite a 35-point effort from Moore.

Honour roll

Players

Current roster

Notable past players

 Eddie Anderson
 /  Clifton Bush
 Glen Dandridge
 Glen Denham
 /  Richie Edwards
 Mickell Gladness
 Angelo Hill
 Clyde Huntley
 /  Marcel Jones
 Jeremy Kendle
 Jeremy Kench
 /  Terrence Lewis
 Damian Matacz
 McKenzie Moore
 Kenny Perkins
 John Rademakers
 Matthew Rogers
 Ethan Rusbatch
 Jermaine Taylor
 Reuben Te Rangi
 Dennis Trammell
 /  Arthur Trousdell
 Chris Tupu
 Carlo Varicchio
 Marques Whippy
 John Whorton
 Robert Wilson

Coaches

Head coaches
 Murray McKay (1981–1983)
 Darrell Todd (1984–1985)
 Garry Pettis (1986–1988)
 Keith Mair (1989–1995)
 Bert Knops (1996–1999)
 Matt Ruscoe (2000–2001)
 John Watson (2002–2004)
 Pete McAllister (2004–2005)
 Chris Sparks (2006–2007)
 Bert Knops (2008)
 Dave Harrison (2014)
 Mark Dickel (2015–2018)
 Mick Downer (2019–2021)
 Judd Flavell (2022–present)

Assistant coaches
 Darrell Todd (1981–1983)
 Garry Pettis (1984–1985)
 Bert Knops (1986–1995)
 Phil Burns (1996–1999)
 John Watson (2000–2001)
 Darren Gravly (2000–2001)
 Dave Harrison (2000–2001)
 Pete McAllister (2002–2004; 2014)
 Dene Robinson (2002–2005)
 Clinton Olsen (2005)
 Terry Brunel (2006–2008; 2019–2021)
 Kenny Perkins (2007)
 Tim Bennetts (2014)
 Caleb Harrison (2015)
 Piet Van Hasselt (2015–2021)
 Ben Sheat (2016–2018; 2022–present)
 George Robinson (2021)
 Liam Connelly (2022–present)
 Adam Morgan (2022–present)
 Ed Book (2022–present)

Source: Canterbury Rams Facebook page

References

External links
Official team website

Andrew Harrison: the unassuming man behind the Canterbury Rams' NBL success

Basketball teams in New Zealand
National Basketball League (New Zealand) teams
Sport in Christchurch
Basketball teams established in 1981
1981 establishments in New Zealand